Seymour Johnson Air Force Base is a United States Air Force (USAF) base located in Goldsboro, North Carolina. The base is named for U.S. Navy Lt. Seymour A. Johnson, a test pilot from Goldsboro who died in an F4F Wildcat crash near Norbeck, Maryland, on March 5, 1941.

In August 1940 the War Department designated the airport as essential to national defense. In December 1940, $168,811 was authorized for the construction of a U.S. Army Air Corps Technical Training School. Local officials began working to have the field named in honor of Lieutenant Johnson. Seymour Johnson is the only USAF base named in honor of a naval officer.

Based units 
Flying and notable non-flying units based at Seymour Johnson Air Force Base.

Units marked GSU are Geographically Separate Units, which although based at Seymour Johnson, are subordinate to a parent unit based at another location.

United States Air Force 
Air Combat Command (ACC)

 Fifteenth Air Force
4th Fighter Wing (Host Wing)
4th Operations Group
 333d Fighter Squadron – F-15E Strike Eagle
 334th Fighter Squadron – F-15E Strike Eagle
 335th Fighter Squadron – F-15E Strike Eagle
 336th Fighter Squadron – F-15E Strike Eagle
 4th Operations Support Squadron
 4th Training Squadron
 4th Maintenance Group
 333d Fighter Generation Squadron
 334th Fighter Generation Squadron
 335th Fighter Generation Squadron
 336th Fighter Generation Squadron
 4th Component Maintenance Squadron
 4th Equipment Maintenance Squadron
 4th Munitions Squadron 
 4th Medical Group
 4th Medical Support Squadron
 4th Healthcare Operations Squadron
 4th Operational Medical Readiness Squadron
 4th Mission Support Group
 4th Civil Engineer Squadron
 4th Communications Squadron
 4th Contracting Squadron
 4th Force Support Squadron
 4th Logistics Readiness Squadron
 4th Security Forces Squadron

Air Force Reserve Command (AFRC)

 Fourth Air Force
 916th Air Refueling Wing 
 916th Operations Group
 77th Air Refueling Squadron – KC-46A Pegasus
 911th Air Refueling Squadron – KC-46A Pegasus
 916th Operations Support Squadron
 916th Mission Support Group
 916th Civil Engineer Flight
 916th Force Support Squadron 
 916th Logistics Readiness Squadron
 916th Security Forces Squadron
 916th Maintenance Group
 916th Aerospace Medicine Squadron
 916th Aircraft Maintenance Squadron
 916th Maintenance Squadron
 Tenth Air Force
 944th Fighter Wing
 414th Fighter Group (GSU)
 307th Fighter Squadron – F-15E Strike Eagle
 414th Maintenance Squadron
 567th RED HORSE Squadron

See also
1961 Goldsboro B-52 crash

References

External links

Installations of the United States Air Force in North Carolina
Goldsboro, North Carolina
Buildings and structures in Wayne County, North Carolina